Julia Shapiro (born 16 December 1984) is a former pair skater who competed for Russia and Israel. Early in her career, she represented Russia with Igor Petrov, Alexei Sokolov, and Dmitri Khromin. With Sokolov, she is the 2000 World Junior bronze medalist. From 2002 to 2005, Shapiro competed with Vadim Akolzin for Israel. They achieved their best ISU Championship result, tenth, at the 2005 European Championships.

Programs 
(with Akolzin)

Competitive highlights

With Akolzin for Israel

With Khromin for Russia

With Sokolov for Russia

References

External links

 
 Pairs on Ice: Shapiro & Akolzin
 

1984 births
Figure skaters from Saint Petersburg
Living people
Russian female pair skaters
Israeli female pair skaters
Israeli people of Russian-Jewish descent
People from Metula
Soviet Jews
World Junior Figure Skating Championships medalists